The Gruppo Sportivo Forestale was the former sport section of the Italian forestry, fishery and environment police force, State Forestry Corps.

History
Founded in 1955, it has now been integrated since 1 January 2017 into the Sports Group of the Carabinieri (Centro Sportivo Carabinieri).

Famous athletes

Alpine skiing
Deborah Compagnoni

Cross-country skiing
Stefania Belmondo
Antonella Confortola
Manuela Di Centa
Arianna Follis
Cristina Paluselli
Gabriella Paruzzi
Fulvio Valbusa
Sabina Valbusa

Luge
Gerda Weissensteiner

Athletics
Angelo Carosi
Maria Guida
Elisabetta Perrone

Fencing
Giovanna Trillini

Rowing
Marcello Miani

Shooting
Chiara Cainero
Ennio Falco
Maura Genovesi

Whitewater slalom
Daniele Molmenti

Medal table
Many medals have been won by athletes of the Gruppo Sportivo Forestale.

See also
State Forestry Corps
Italian military sports bodies

References

External links
  

Athletics clubs in Italy
Sports organizations established in 1955
1955 establishments in Italy
Forestale
Corpo Forestale dello Stato